Ross Lipman is an American restorationist, independent filmmaker and essayist. He is best known for his 2015 documentary Notfilm, his work with the Bruce Conner Family Trust and as Senior Film Restorationist at the UCLA Film & Television Archive, where he restored numerous independent and avant-garde works.

Lipman was the 2008 recipient of Anthology Film Archives' Preservation Honors, and is a three-time winner of the National Society of Film Critics' Heritage Award.

Lipman's essays on film history, technology, and aesthetics have been published in Artforum, Sight and Sound, and in numerous academic books and journals and his films have been screened internationally and have been collected by museums and archives.

His 2015 feature-length documentary Notfilm about Samuel Beckett's Film was produced and distributed by Milestone Films and premiered at the BFI London Film Festival. The documentary was prompted by the discovery of long-missing footage from the original production of Film, which Lipman discovered amid reels of outtakes in the apartment of Grove Press publisher and Film producer, Barney Rosset.

Publications
Known for his contributions to the theory of film restoration, particularly the ethics involved in restoring independent and experimental film, Ross Lipman has contributed numerous essays on the subject, beginning with “Problems of Independent Film Preservation” in 1996 and consolidated in “The Gray Zone: A Restorationist’s Travel Guide” in 2009.

Lipman's conceptualization of restoration theory has developed from years of practice within the field. His ideas have been controversial in acknowledging a subjectivity inherent in the process of restoration itself, a position once considered taboo from art conservation orthodoxy, but gaining increasing credence in recent years as museum conservators have been confronted with the transient nature of many post-war and contemporary artworks.  Lipman is also the author of several historical analytical essays, including a definitive history of John Cassavetes and his collaboration with Charles Mingus on the score for Shadows, as well as an analysis of the ground-breaking production techniques used in Kent Mackenzie's The Exiles (1961).

Filmmaking and Performance Essays
Ross Lipman's early works span across a multiplicity of forms. Of his films, Doug Cummings of LA Weekly wrote, "Lipman's repertoire often highlights unique social groups with whom he has lived", and his earlier films frequently explore themes of cultural decay and renewal.

With the completed prologue for the in-progress documentary feature Keep Warm, Burn Britain!, Lipman uses still images to remember squatters he encountered in Thatcherite mid-1980s London. His more recent films continue in this essayistic vein, integrating visual artwork and scholarship.

Ross Lipman's performance essays are often concerned with the intersection of cinema history and lived experience. His best known performance is The Book of Paradise Has No Author, which premiered Aug. 2011 at the Inquiry Towards the Practice of Secular Magic, a cross-disciplinary event at piXel (+) freQuency, hosted by Los Angeles Filmforum and presented by the Disembodied Theater Corporation. The piece explores notions of "first encounters" with lost cultures, viewed through the prism of the Tasaday tribe, who were, according to a 1972 episode of 20/20, a primitive tribe that had only recently encountered contemporary civilization.

The performance essay The Exploding Digital Inevitable premiered at International Film Festival Rotterdam in January 2017. The essay concerns the process of restoring Bruce Conner's classic avant-garde short Crossroads (1976 film), for which several versions existed.

Restoration
Ross Lipman was mentored by and worked under Robert Gitt, well-known UCLA Film & Television Archive restorationist who restored or supervised the restoration of over 360 films. Lipman adapted and developed methods of applying these principles to the restoration of independent and experimental film, where the primary concept is that moving image restoration is a form of interdisciplinary art practice that differs from other visual art forms in its production for mass duplication. Lipman has theorized and elaborated on this concept in numerous publications.

Restored Narrative Films
 Spring Night, Summer Night (1967) - J.L. Anderson
 Brandy in the Wilderness (1969) - Stanton Kaye
 Bless Their Little Hearts (1984) - Billy Woodberry
 Wanda (1970) - Barbara Loden
 The Connection (1961) - Shirley Clarke
 The Exiles (1961) - Kent Mackenzie
 Come Back to the Five and Dime, Jimmy Dean, Jimmy Dean (1982) - Robert Altman
 A Woman Under the Influence (1974) - John Cassavetes
 Faces (1968) - John Cassavetes
 Shadows (1959) - John Cassavetes
 Matewan (1987) - John Sayles
 Lianna (1981) - John Sayles
 Return of the Secaucus Seven (1979) - John Sayles
 Killer of Sheep (1977) - Charles Burnett
 The Horse (1973) - Charles Burnett
 Several Friends (1969) - Charles Burnett
 Please! Don't Bury Me Alive! (1977) - Efrain Gutierrez
 Tillie's Punctured Romance (1914) - Mack Sennett
 The Juniper Tree (1990) - Nietzchka Keene
 The Man Without a World (1991) - Eleanor Antin

Restored Experimental Films
 A Movie (1958) - Bruce Conner
 Crossroads (1976) - Bruce Conner
 Diary of an African Nun (1977) - Julie Dash
 Four Women (1975) - Julie Dash
 Love Objects & Other Short films (1969-1971) - Tom Chomont
 Film (1964) - Samuel Beckett & Alan Schneider
 Rabbit's Moon (1971) - Kenneth Anger
 Kustom Kar Kommandos (1965) - Kenneth Anger
 Scorpio Rising (1963) - Kenneth Anger
 Fireworks (1947) - Kenneth Anger
 Stop Cloning Around (1980) - Sid Laverents
 Multiple Sidosis (1970) - Sid Laverents
 One Man Band (1964) - Sid Laverents
 It Sudses and Sudses and Sudses (1962) - Sid Laverents
 Dawn to Dawn (1933) - Josef Berne
 Reel (1973) - Derek Boshier

Restored Documentary Films
 Hoop Dreams (1994) - Steve James
 Eadweard Muybridge, Zoopraxographer (1975) - Thom Andersen
 Ornette: Made in America (1984) - Shirley Clarke
 The Sid Saga (parts 1-3) (1985-89) - Sid Laverents
 Word is Out: Stories of Some of Our Lives (1978) - Peter Adair
 The Times of Harvey Milk (1984) - Rob Epstein
 Sunday (1961) - Dan Drasin
 La Onda Chicana (1977) - Efrain Gutierrez
 In the Year of the Pig (1968) - Emile de Antonio
 Point of Order! (1964) - Emile de Antonio
 USA Poetry: Allen Ginsberg (1965/75) - WNET
 USA Poetry: Anne Sexton (1965/75) - WNET
 São Paulo de Ontem, São Paulo de Hoje (1943) - Anonymous
 Native Land (1942) - Leo Hurwitz, Paul Strand
 It's All True (1941) - Orson Welles
 Tri pesni o Lenine (Three Songs of Lenin) (1938) - Dziga Vertov

Filmography
 The Case of the Vanishing Gods (2020 - in progress)
 In the Middle of the Nights:  From Arthouse to Grindhouse and Back Again (2020)
 Between Two Cinemas (2018)
 Billy and Charles (2018)
 Notfilm (2015)
 Keep Warm, Burn Britain!
 Personal Ethnographies (2007 - 2013)
 Dr. Bish Remedies
 Afternoon in Bottle Village
 Clean MRF / Dirty MRF
 Transmissions From The Link
 At the Dolores
 Nora Keyes in the Ghost City
 Claire's Dream
 Self-portrait in Mausoleum 
 Death Valley Story 
 The Perfect Heart of Flux (2007 - 2013)
 Ocean Beach / Point Lobos I, II, III. 
 Afternoon in Bottle Village 
 Clean MRF / Dirty MRF 
 Curva Peligrosa 
 Casa Loma (Dignity and Impudence) 
 Tracy, California 
 Cheonggye Stream Renovation 
 In The Treeless Forest 
 Self-portrait in Mausoleum 
 Found Sand Mandala 
 Rhythm 06 (2008)
 The Interview (2004)
 Michael Barrish Screen Test (1997)
 Rhythm 93 (1993-94)
 Rhythm 92 (1992-93)
 Kino-i (1991)
 10-17-88 (1989)

References

External links
 

Living people
Date of birth missing (living people)
American filmmakers
University of California, Los Angeles faculty
American essayists
Year of birth missing (living people)